Lucas de Penna (Luca da Penne, Luca da Penna, Luca De Penna) (c. 1325 – c. 1390) was a fourteenth-century Neapolitan jurist and a judge of the Magna Curia at Naples. 

He is known for his Commentaria in tres libros Codicis Justiniani imperatoris, a commentary on part of the Code of Justinian. It was printed in 1512. He also wrote a Summaria on Valerius Maximus.

References
Walter Ullmann (1946), The Medieval Idea of Law as Represented by Lucas de Penna: A Study in Fourteenth-Century Legal Scholarship
Francesco Calasso (1932),  Studi sul commento ai tres libri di Luca da Penne : la nascita e i metodi dell'opera
Maria M. Wronowska (1925), Luca da Penne e l'opera sua

External links
Short biography (Italian language)

1320s births
1390s deaths
14th-century Italian jurists